The Star is an English-language newspaper in Malaysia. Based in Petaling Jaya, it was established in 1971 as a regional newspaper in Penang. It is the largest paid English newspaper in terms of circulation in Malaysia, according to the Audit Bureau of Circulations. It has a daily circulation of about 250,000 (as of January 2017), far eclipsing the circulation of its next-largest paid English-language competitor, the New Straits Times (which has a circulation of approximately 65,000). 

The Star is a member of the Asia News Network. It is owned by the publicly listed Star Media Group.

History 
The daily newspaper was first published on 9 September 1971 as a regional newspaper based in Penang. The STAR went into national circulation on 3 January 1976 when it set up its new office in Kuala Lumpur. In 1978, the newspaper headquarters was relocated to Kuala Lumpur. The Star continues to expand its wings over the years. In 1981, it moved its headquarters from Kuala Lumpur to Petaling Jaya which is also its current premise to accommodate a growing number of staff and technology devices.

In 1987, The Star was one of the newspapers whose publication licences were withdrawn in Operation Lalang.  It resumed publication five months later in March 1988, but after its return, The Star lost its previous 'liberal flavour'.

It was the first Malaysian paper to offer an online edition.

The Star's dominant position as Malaysia's leading English-language newspaper has, for decades, been of significant benefit to its major shareholder, the Malaysian Chinese Association (MCA) political party (which ruled from the independence of Malaya until 2018 as a junior member of the Barisan Nasional coalition). Between 1997 and 2007, it was estimated that the MCA's investment arm, Huaren Holdings, collected MYR270 million in dividends - almost exclusively from their 42% shareholding in the Star's parent company - with dividends peaking at MYR40 million per year between 2005 and 2007. Despite a significant portion of these dividends funding debts from their later acquisition of Nanyang Siang Pau, a total of MYR100 million was still paid out to the MCA between 2001 and 2007.

Editions 
The Star (daily) and Sunday Star are published in five editions. Two editions cover the northern peninsular states of Penang, Kedah, Perlis, Kelantan and northern Perak, while another two editions cover the rest of the country. As of March 2010, the newspaper has a separate Sarawak edition priced at RM1.20.

There are two main printing plants that publish four editions of The Star on a daily basis. The northern editions are printed at the Star Northern Hub in Bayan Lepas, Penang, while the other two editions are printed at the Star Media Hub in Bukit Jelutong, Shah Alam, Selangor.

Features 
The Star weekday paper is packaged as a 4-in-1 paper, comprising the Main Paper, StarBiz, Star2 and Star Metro. Naturally, this newspaper also contains classifieds.

The Main Paper covers the latest in both local and international news while StarBiz offers a comprehensive coverage of business developments, market trends, financial reports and updates in the stock market. Star2 features articles on lifestyle, entertainment, health, parenting,  social etiquette, science, environment, fashion, food, comics and many more. The contents published on the Star Metro varies by edition, covering news and events in a particular region covered by each edition.

Weekly sections include:
StarBytz (every Monday; formerly known as In-Tech): focuses on computers and information technology
StarEducate (Sundays): features careers, school, exam tips, advice on furthering education, commentaries by renowned educationists and updates in the education industry
Star Fit4Life (Sundays): focuses on various aspects of well-being, from medical research to treatments, fitness trends, diet and nutrition, mental health, ageing and public health issues, alternative therapy and healing methods
Life Inspired (Sundays): a luxury-focused pull-out covering topics from art, architecture, travel, fashion, food and more. This section was launched in October 2013.
Dots (Sundays): News and articles sourced from international media partners covering a varied range of topics from politics and society to people. Provides a deeper insight into thoughts, senses and outlook
The Star BizWeek is a weekly financial magazine published every Saturday that highlights issues, companies, personalities, developments, and stocks that are likely to make news in the week ahead
F1F4 is a fortnightly pull-out published on alternate Mondays. It contains information about Mathematics and Science syllabus for Form One and Form Four.
Stuff@school is a weekly pullout distributed every Monday to schools that subscribe to The Star. It features newsy articles, interviews, book reviews and short stories dedicated to teens.
Star Metro is a pull-out featuring news and events from all of Malaysia and occasionally, abroad. Star Metro also features the classifieds.
CarSifu is a pullout distributed every twice a month on alternating Thursdays that offers updates on the automobile scene.

R.AGE now does video-based content with an investigative angle. Their work with the Predator in My Phone series led to the passing of the Sexual Offences Against Children Act 2017. They are currently working to unravel the student trafficking syndicate in Malaysia, featured in their series Student/Trafficked

Columnists 
Notable columnists for The Star include Marina Mahathir, a socio-political activist and writer, Martin Khor (since 1978), former head of the Third World Network, and law professor Shad Saleem Faruqi.

Tunku Abdul Rahman, the first Prime Minister and chairman of the paper's parent company from the 1977 to 1989, also contributed to the newspaper through his column Looking Back which was published every Monday from 1974 to 1989. His writings in the column, which consisted of his personal accounts in the ruling party in regards to seeking Malaysia's independence, were deemed to be influential and so closely associated with the paper that its name was often backronymed by some readers as Suara Tunku Abdul Rahman.

Ownership 
The Star is a party-owned paper, associated with the former government of Malaysia. Since 1977, The Star has been effectively controlled by the Malaysian Chinese Association, a component party in the Barisan Nasional alliance, though it is part of the publicly listed Star Media Group (MYX: 6084). The largest stake, at 42.46%, is held by the MCA; the three next-largest shareholders are Amanah Saham Bumiputera, a unit trust scheme exclusive to Bumiputera (15.44%), the Malaysian superannuation scheme, the Employees Provident Fund (5.98%) and Tabung Haji, the government-run hajj savings and investment fund (5.42%).

Reception 
A 2020 Reuters Institute poll found that 56% of Malaysian respondents trusted reporting from The Star. The percentage was tied with New Straits Times as the third highest out of the 14 media outlets surveyed.

See also 

 List of newspapers in Malaysia

References

External links 
 

English-language newspapers published in Asia
Mass media in Kuala Lumpur
Newspapers published in Malaysia
Penang
Mass media in Petaling Jaya
Newspapers established in 1971
1971 establishments in Malaysia
Mass media in George Town, Penang
Malaysian Chinese Association
Asian news websites
Malaysian news websites